Yomna Farid (born 28 June 1983) is a retired Egyptian tennis player.

Farid has career-high WTA rankings of 607 in singles and 480 in doubles, both achieved in 2003. In her career, she won one doubles title on the ITF circuit.

Playing for Egypt in Fed Cup, Farid has a win–loss record of 9–19.

Career
Born in Alexandria, Farid started playing tennis aged 12; her favourite surface has been clay.

She had a successful junior career, winning six singles and five doubles titles on the ITF junior circuit. Her career-high ranking as a junior was world number 38, and she finished her junior career with a record of 80–45.

Farid made her WTA Tour main-draw debut at the 1999 Dreamland Egypt Classic, in the doubles event partnering Marwa El Wany.
She retired from professional tennis 2006.

ITF finals

Doubles (1–1)

ITF junior finals

Singles (6–2)

Doubles (5–2)

External links
 
 
 

1983 births
Living people
Egyptian female tennis players
Sportspeople from Alexandria